Drew Hayden Taylor (born 1 July 1962) is a Canadian playwright, author and journalist.

Life and career
Born in Curve Lake, Ontario, Taylor is part Ojibwe and part Caucasian. About his background Taylor says: "I plan to start my own nation. Because I am half Ojibway half Caucasian, we will be called the occasions. And of course, since I’m founding the new nation, I will be a special occasion." He also mused in a Globe and Mail essay: "Fighting over status/non-status, Métis, skin colour etc., only increases the sense of dysfunction in our community."

He writes about First Nations culture and has also been a frequent contributor to various magazines including This Magazine. His writing includes plays, short stories, essays, newspaper columns and film and television work. In 2004 he was appointed to the Ontario Ministry of Culture Advisory Committee.

As well as his writing, Taylor has been the artistic director of Native Earth Performing Arts, and has taught at the Centre for Indigenous Theatre. He co-created the series Mixed Blessings for APTN in 2007, and has been a writer for The Beachcombers, Street Legal and North of 60, and has made documentary films for CBC Television, including Searching for Winnetou, Cottagers and Indians and The Pretendians.

Taylor has held writer-in-residence positions at Native Earth Performing Arts, Cahoots Theatre, the University of Michigan, The University of Western Ontario, the Stephen Leacock Festival, the Blyth Festival, Lüneburg University, and Ryerson University (now Toronto Metropolitan University).

Partial bibliography

Non-fiction

 Funny, You Don't Look Like One (1998)
 Further Adventures of a Blue-Eyed Ojibway: Funny, You Don’t Look Like One #2 (1999)
 Furious Observations of a Blue-Eyed Ojibway: Funny, You Don’t Look Like One #3 (2002)
 Futile observations of the Blue-Eyed Ojibway: Funny, You Don’t Look Like One #4 (2004)
 NEWS: Postcards from the Four Directions (2010)
 The Best of Funny, You Don’t Look Like One (anthology from first three editions) (2015)
 Me Tomorrow: Indigenous Views On the Future (2021)

Collections edited

 Voices: Being Native in Canada, with Linda Jaine (1992)
 Me Funny (2006)
 Me Sexy (2008)
 Drew Hayden Taylor: Essays on His Works (2008)
 Me Artsy (2015)

Fiction

 Fearless Warriors (short Stories) (1998)
 The Night Wanderer: A Native Gothic Novel (2007)
 Motorcycles and Sweetgrass (2010)
 The Night Wanderer: A Graphic Novel, illustrated by Mike Wyatt (2013)
 Take Us To Your Chief: and Other Stories (short stories) (2016)
 Chasing Painted Horses (2019)

Plays produced
(By year of first production)

 Toronto at Dreamer’s Rock (1989)
 Education is Our Right (1990)
 Talking Pictures (1990)
 The Bootlegger Blues (1990)
 Someday (1991)
 The All Complete Aboriginal Show Extravaganza (1994)
 Girl Who Loved Her Horses (1995)
 The Baby Blues (1995)
 400 Kilometres (1996)
 Only Drunks and Children Tell the Truth (1996)
 alterNatives (1999)
 Toronto@DreamersRock.com  (1999)
 The Boy in the Treehouse (2000)
 The Buz’Gem Blues (2001)
 Sucker Falls (2001)
 Raven Stole the Sun (2004)
 In a World Created by a Drunken God (2004)
 The Berlin Blues (2007)
 Three Tricksters (2009)
 Dead White Writer on the Floor (2010)
 God and The Indian (2013)
 Cerulean Blue (2014)
 Spirit Horse (2016)
 Cottagers and Indians (2018)

References

External links
 

 Drew Hayden Taylor at the Whetung Ojibwa Centre

First Nations dramatists and playwrights
Canadian humorists
20th-century Canadian dramatists and playwrights
21st-century Canadian dramatists and playwrights
Ojibwe people
1962 births
Living people
Writers from Ontario
Canadian television writers
University of Michigan people
Canadian male dramatists and playwrights
First Nations screenwriters
20th-century Canadian male writers
21st-century Canadian male writers
20th-century First Nations writers
21st-century First Nations writers
Canadian male television writers
Canadian artistic directors
Canadian social commentators